The Red River Compact was signed by the states of Arkansas, Louisiana, Oklahoma and Texas to avoid disputes over the waters of the Red River in 1978, although Congress had authorized the compact in 1955. The Red River Compact Commission has nine commissioners, two from each member state and one federal representative appointed by the President of the United States.

Although the Red River Compact has provisions for how much water each state can use or store from the Red River Basin, the Commission is a means of working out issues and problems, and this has reduced the chances of litigation. In recent years, the Commission has addressed problems of water quality and pollution, as well as questions of quantity.

See also
Title 18 of the Code of Federal Regulations
Colorado River Compact
Columbia River Gorge Commission 
Connecticut River Valley Flood Control Commission
Delaware River Basin Commission 
Interstate Commission on the Potomac River Basin 
Susquehanna River Basin Commission
Tarrant Regional Water Dist. v. Herrmann

References

United States interstate agencies
Government agencies established in 1978
Water management authorities in the United States
Water resource management in the United States
United States interstate compacts
Arkansas law
Louisiana law
Oklahoma law
Texas law
Water law in the United States